Edward Schroeder Brooks (June 14, 1867 – July 12, 1957) was a Republican member of the U.S. House of Representatives from Pennsylvania.

Early life
Edward S. Brooks was born in York, Pennsylvania.  He attended the York County Academy and York Collegiate Institute.

Career
He was engaged as a banker, manufacturer of steel forgings, and as a contractor.  He served as a member of the city council from 1897 to 1902, and as treasurer of York County, Pennsylvania, from 1903 to 1905.  He was a member of the Republican State committee in 1917 and 1918.

Brooks was elected as a Republican to the Sixty-sixth and Sixty-seventh Congresses.  He was not a candidate for renomination in 1922.  After his time in Congress, he served as acting postmaster of York, Pennsylvania, from September 30, 1925, until February 23, 1926, and postmaster from 1926 to 1931.  He was engaged in the clothing business from 1937 until his retirement.

Personal life
He was a member of Knights of Pythias.

Death
He died in York and is buried in Prospect Hill Cemetery.

Sources

The Political Graveyard

1867 births
1957 deaths
Politicians from York, Pennsylvania
American Lutherans
Pennsylvania postmasters
Pennsylvania city council members
Republican Party members of the United States House of Representatives from Pennsylvania